The First National State Bank Building is located at 810 Broad Street in Newark, Essex County, New Jersey, United States.  The building was designed by Cass Gilbert and was built in 1912. The building stands  and is twelve stories tall with a steel frame and with a facade of applied masonry. It was added to the National Register of Historic Places on August 10, 1977.

After sitting abandoned for many years, although the ground floor was occupied by a series of retail establishments, the building was renovated and converted into a Hotel Indigo by Hanini Developers and opened in August 2014.

See also 

 National Register of Historic Places listings in Essex County, New Jersey
 List of tallest buildings in Newark
 Four Corners Historic District

References 

Bank buildings on the National Register of Historic Places in New Jersey
Skyscrapers in Newark, New Jersey
Commercial buildings completed in 1912
Art Deco architecture in New Jersey
Cass Gilbert buildings
National Register of Historic Places in Newark, New Jersey
1912 establishments in New Jersey
New Jersey Register of Historic Places
Skyscraper hotels in New Jersey
Historic district contributing properties in Newark, New Jersey